Chilades naidina is a butterfly in the family Lycaenidae. It is found in Ethiopia, Somalia, eastern Uganda, Kenya and Tanzania. The habitat consists of grassy areas in savanna, especially dry Acacia savanna.

Both sexes are attracted to flowers.

The larvae feed on Acacia species.

References

Butterflies described in 1886
Chilades
Butterflies of Africa
Taxa named by Arthur Gardiner Butler